Louis Ruffet (13 April 1836, in Nyon – 1923) was a Swiss Protestant theologian and church historian.

In 1859 he received his bachelor's degree in theology at the École de theologie in Geneva and became ordained as a minister at the Église de l'Oratoire. He served as a minister in the French communities of Royan, Le Creusot and Aix-les-Bains, and in 1861 returned to Geneva as a minister at the Église de l'Oratoire, where he preached until 1869. In 1870–72 he worked as a director of a seminary in Lausanne, and afterwards, taught classes in church history at the École de théologie in Geneva. In 1874 he was awarded an honorary doctorate in theology from Princeton University.

Selected works 
 Thascius Cyprien, évêque de Carthage et les persécutions de son temps, 1872 – Cyprian, bishop of Carthage and the persecutions of his time. 
 (François) Lambert d'Avignon, le réformateur de la Hesse – Francis Lambert of Avignon, the reformer of Hesse.
 Pietro Carnesecchi, un martyr de la Réforme en Italie, 1874 – Pietro Carnesecchi, a martyr of the Reformation in Italy.
 Vie de César Pronier et fragments de ses écrits, 1875 – Life of Caesar Pronier and fragments of his writings.
 J.-L. Micheli : Notice biographique, 1875 – Biographical notice of Jean-Louis Micheli.
 Un grand libéral chrétien : le comte Agénor de Gasparin, 1884 – A great liberal Christian, Agénor de Gasparin. 
 Georges Fox et les origines du Quakerisme 1624-1660, 1886 – George Fox and the origins of Quakerism, 1624–60.
 Le devoir des chrétiens évangéliques dans la question de l'esclavage en Afrique, 1891 – The duty of evangelical Christians regarding the issue of slavery in Africa.
 Luther et la diète de Worms, 1903 – Martin Luther and the Diet of Worms.
 Calvin et Servet : leçon publique, 1910 – John Calvin and Michael Servetus, public lessons.
 Jean Hus, le réformateur de la Bohême – John Hus, the reformer of Bohemia.

References 

1846 births
1923 deaths
People from Nyon
Swiss Protestant theologians
Swiss Protestant ministers
Historians of Christianity
Swiss historians of religion